Rubén Sánchez García (born 21 January 1989) is a Spanish footballer who plays for CP Villarrobledo as a winger.

Club career
Born in Albacete, Castile-La Mancha, Sánchez finished his youth career with local Albacete Balompié, and made his senior debuts with Villarreal CF's C-team in 2007–08, in Tercera División. During the season he also appeared with the reserves in Segunda División B and, on 2 February 2009, was loaned to CD Guadalajara also in the third level.

In the 2009 summer, Sánchez left the Valencians and signed with neighbouring Valencia CF Mestalla. One year later he joined another reserve team, Real Valladolid B, making his official debut with the main squad on 8 September 2010 by playing the entire second half of a 1–0 home success over SD Huesca for the campaign's Copa del Rey.

Sánchez competed in the third tier in the following years, representing Getafe CF B, Atlético Madrid B, Zamora CF, Real Murcia, SD Compostela, CD Mensajero and UD Melilla.

References

External links

1989 births
Living people
Sportspeople from Albacete
Spanish footballers
Footballers from Castilla–La Mancha
Association football wingers
Segunda División B players
Tercera División players
Villarreal CF C players
Villarreal CF B players
CD Guadalajara (Spain) footballers
Valencia CF Mestalla footballers
Real Valladolid Promesas players
Real Valladolid players
Getafe CF B players
Atlético Madrid B players
Zamora CF footballers
Real Murcia players
SD Compostela footballers
CD Mensajero players
UD Melilla footballers
CD Lealtad players
UD San Sebastián de los Reyes players
Catalonia international guest footballers